The  was a two-seat unequal-span biplane trainer that served in the Imperial Japanese Navy during World War II. Due to its bright orange paint scheme (applied to all Japanese military trainers for visibility), it earned the nickname "aka-tombo", or "red dragonfly", after a type of insect common throughout Japan.

A K5Y of the Kamikaze Special Attack Corps 3rd Ryuko Squadron was credited with sinking the destroyer USS Callaghan on July 28, 1945, the last US warship lost to kamikaze attack during the war.

Design and development
The aircraft was based on the Yokosuka Navy Type 91 Intermediate Trainer, but stability problems led to a redesign by Kawanishi in 1933. It entered service in 1934 as Navy Type 93 Intermediate Trainer K5Y1 with fixed tail-skid landing gear, and remained in use throughout the war. Floatplane types K5Y2 and K5Y3 were also produced. After the initial 60 examples by Kawanishi, production was continued by Watanabe (556 aircraft built), Mitsubishi (60), Hitachi (1,393), First Naval Air Technical Arsenal (75), Nakajima (24), Nippon (2,733), and Fuji (896), for a total of 5,770. These aircraft were the mainstay of Imperial Japanese Navy Air Service's flight training, and as intermediate trainers, they were capable of performing demanding aerobatic maneuvers. Two further land-based versions, the K5Y4 with a 358 kW (480 hp) Amakaze 21A engine and the K5Y5 with a 384 kW (515 hp) Amakaze 15, were projected but never built.

Variants

K5Y1
 Two-seat intermediate trainer for the Imperial Japanese Navy.
K5Y2
 Floatplane version, with Amakaze 11 engine.
K5Y3
 Floatplane, with 384 kW (515 hp) Amakaze 21.
K5Y4
 Projected land-based version with 358 kW (480 hp) Amakaze 21A. Never built.
K5Y5
 Projected land-based version with 384 kW (515 hp) Amakaze 15. Never built.

Operators

Imperial Japanese Navy

Postwar

Indonesian People's Security Agency and later Indonesian Air Force operated derelict aircraft against Dutch colonial rule. On July 29 1947, the Indonesians using 2 units of Yokosuka K5Y (Called "Cureng/Churen" by Indonesian fighters) with one "Guntei Bomber" (Mitsubishi Ki-51) from Maguwo Air Force Base, Yogyakarta for bombing Dutch strategic positions in Ambarawa, Salatiga and Semarang. On its original plan, Nakajima Ki-43 "Hayabusa" also planned to be involved too in this operation, but cancelled as the aircraft suffered technical difficulties. It is currently on display at Yogyakarta (Dirgantara Mandala Museum).

Specifications (K5Y2 floatplane)

See also

Notes

Bibliography
 Collier, Basil. Japanese Aircraft of World War II. London: Sidgwick & Jackson, 1979. .

 
 Mondey, David. The Concise Guide to Axis Aircraft of World War II. London: Chancellor Press, 1996. .
 Tagaya, Osamu. Imperial Japanese Naval Aviator, 1937-45. Botley, Oxfordshire, UK: Osprey Publishing, 2003. .

External links

 http://www.combinedfleet.com/ijna/k5y.htm

World War II Japanese trainer aircraft
K05Y, Yokosuka
K05Y, Yokosuka
Biplanes
K5Y
Single-engined tractor aircraft
Aircraft first flown in 1933